Zernikow is the name of the following places in Brandenburg: 
 Zernikow (Großwoltersdorf), part of Großwoltersdorf municipality near Gransee
Zernikow (Uckermark), part of Nordwestuckermark municipality near Prenzlau
Zernikow (Plattenburg), part of Plattenburg municipality near Bad Wilsnack